This is a list of members of the Bougainville House of Representatives from 2005 to 2010 as elected at the 2005 election.

References

Bougainville House of Representatives